Operation Flagship was a sting operation jointly organized by the United States Marshals Service and the Metropolitan Police Department in Washington, D.C. that resulted in the arrest of 101 wanted fugitives on December 15, 1985.

The fugitives voluntarily went to the Washington Convention Center, responding to an invite sent by law enforcement posing as a fictitious television company, to claim two free tickets to watch the Washington Redskins home game against the Cincinnati Bengals and for a chance to win tickets to Super Bowl XX. A total of 166 marshals and police officers were involved in the operation, several of whom were disguised as tuxedo-wearing ushers, cheerleaders, emcees, caterers, mascots, and maintenance staff.

The operation has been hailed as one of the largest and most successful mass arrests of fugitives by American law enforcement.

Background 
From 1981 to 1986, the U.S. Marshals Service conducted a series of nine operations called Fugitive Investigative Strike Team (FIST) operations, with the aim of capturing thousands of wanted fugitives in the United States.

One tactic the U.S. Marshals used to lure fugitives were "get-something-for-nothing" schemes which were often quite successful. This was demonstrated in 1984 when U.S. Marshals conducted FIST VII, a large-scale operation spanning over two months and eight states that resulted in the arrest of 3,309 fugitives. In New York City, fugitives were sent a notice from the fictitious Brooklyn Bridge Delivery Service to pick up their "valuable" packages. In Buffalo, fugitives were notified that they had won between $250 to $10,000 in a lottery. In Hartford, Connecticut younger fugitives were notified that they had won two free tickets to a Boy George concert, including dinner for two and the use of a limousine. In all cases, the fugitives were arrested when they tried to claim their packages or prizes at specified locations. For the marshals, arresting fugitives while away from home was significantly safer as they are often caught unarmed and off-guard. 

At least half of the 3,309 fugitives arrested in FIST VII were later released on bail.

Preparation
For Operation Flagship, while having dinner, Chief Deputy U.S. Marshal Tobias P. Roche (District of Columbia and U.S. Marshal Herbert M. Rutherford III (District of Columbia) noted the uproar of support for the Washington Redskins, particularly the difficulty in acquiring tickets for their sold-out home games and the fact that the waiting list for season tickets lasts several years. They particularly focused on the much-anticipated December 15 game between the Redskins and the Bengals, the winner of which would determine who would go to the playoffs.

In November 1985, Roche with the approval of Rutherford instructed Deputy U.S. Marshals (District of Columbia) and fugitive task force members of the Washington D.C. Metropolitan Police Department to mail invitations to the last known addresses of approximately 3,000 wanted persons. The invitations were sent by the fictitious firm Flagship International Sports Television, which shares the same acronym with Fugitive Investigative Strike Team. The recipients were told that as part of the firm's promotional offer, they had won two complementary tickets to the Redskins-Bengals game and that they were invited to a pre-game brunch at the Washington Convention Center on the morning of December 15, 1985. The recipients were also told they can enter a raffle draw to win 10 seasons tickets for the Washington Redskins and the grand prize of a week-long, all expenses paid trip to New Orleans to watch Super Bowl XX.

The fugitives were wanted for various felonies including assault, robbery, burglary, escape, narcotics violations, rape, arson, fraud, or a combination thereof. Of the 3,000 people who were sent invitations, 167 replied positively to the invitation. 

Various clues were left by Chief Deputy U.S. Marshal Tobias Roche, who authored the ruse. For example, the invitation letters sent by the marshals were signed by "I. Michael Detnaw" ("wanted" spelled backwards) and when the fugitives called the specified telephone number to confirm their attendance, an operator would redirect them to Flagship's business manager "Markus Cran" ("narc" spelled backwards) while the song "I Fought the Law" played in the background.

Still, the ruse was convincing enough that on the morning of December 15, a lawyer representing the actual local broadcaster for the Redskins game went to the police command post to issue a cease-and-desist order, complaining that Flagship International did not have the appropriate license to operate in the district.   

The marshals and officers spent six weeks training for the operation, including three dress rehearsals. Deputy marshals were brought in from outside Washington D.C. as the planners feared that some of the fugitives might recognize the local marshals who had guarded them in courtrooms or taken them to jail.

Operation 
The marshals and the police officers arrived at the convention center at 5:30 a.m. on December 15 to set up the operation. To minimize risk, the planners set up two separate areas in the convention center: one area to greet the "guests" and another area where they can separate the fugitives in smaller batches to make the arrests. Although the invitations indicated guests should arrive at 9:00 a.m., many of the excited guests arrived as early as 8:00 a.m.

To make the scene more believable and festive, undercover officers carried balloons, sang Redskins cheers, served buffet brunch, and played videos from the Redskins' first Super Bowl win on the convention center screens. Aside from tuxedos and service crew uniforms, one marshal wore a Redskins war bonnet while another wore a knock-off San Diego Chicken suit to parade around the convention center while also monitoring if the fugitives were becoming suspicious. Every officer involved was armed underneath their costume.

Upon the fugitives' arrival, deputy marshals posing as Flagship International employees checked their IDs, verified their identities through phone calls with backroom staff, and gave them color-coded name tags. Code words such as "double winner" were used to warn that a specific fugitive is considered dangerous. Female undercover officers posing as cheerleaders were tasked with discreetly frisking the fugitives for concealed weapons by offering hugs and putting their arms around their waists while escorting fugitives to the next area.

Louie McKinney, chief of enforcement operations for the U.S. Marshals, posed as the top hat-wearing master of ceremonies for the program exclusive for the "winners". Each group of fugitives, approximately 10-20 per batch, were told to sit down in an auditorium to listen to a few remarks from McKinney after which they will be awarded their prizes. Upon mentioning the signal word "surprise", 25 members of the Special Operations Group commanded by the late Deputy U.S. Marshal William F. Degan, Jr. wearing tactical gear would storm the auditorium and quickly surround the fugitives. They were then handcuffed and escorted outside to awaiting buses. A total of 101 fugitives were arrested by the end of the operation.

Aftermath and legacy 
Reporters from CBS and the Los Angeles Times were specifically invited by the marshals to document and publicize the operation. Stanley Morris, the director of the U.S. Marshals Service at the time, credited the media coverage for boosting the organization's profile with the general public.

Two days after the operation, an editorial by The Washington Post enumerated the criminal records of the arrested fugitives: "15 warrants for assault, five for robbery, six for burglary, four for escape, 19 for bond default or bail violation, 18 for narcotics violations, 59 for probation or parole violation and 41 for a variety of charges from rape to arson to forgery." The total cost for Operation Flagship amounted to $22,100, or approximately $218.81 per arrest. In comparison, the U.S. Marshals Service typically spent an average of $1,295 per arrest in 1985.

Two of the marshals involved in the operation, Louie McKinney (the master of ceremonies) and Stacia Hylton (one of the cheerleaders), went on to become directors of the U.S. Marshals Service.

In 2016, NFL Films produced a short documentary featuring interviews with McKinney, Hylton, Roche, and Rutherford involved. In 2017, ESPN produced a 30 for 30 documentary short about the operation called "Strike Team".

Writing in 2019, authors Jerry Clark and Ed Palattella described Operation Flagship as "one of the most legendary and effective in the history of the U.S. Marshals Service." They attributed its "double success" to the sheer number of fugitives caught in a single operation while also avoiding the dangers typically associated with capturing them at home or on the streets.

Further reading

References

External links

Washington Redskins
United States Marshals Service
Metropolitan Police Department of the District of Columbia
Law enforcement in Washington, D.C.